Tshisekedi is a surname. Notable people with the surname include:

 Denise Nyakéru Tshisekedi (born 1970), wife of Felix
 Etienne Tshisekedi (1932–2017), Congolese politician and party leader
 Félix Tshisekedi (born 1963), Congolese politician and president of the Democratic Republic of the Congo

Kongo-language surnames
Surnames of the Democratic Republic of the Congo